Czech Republic competed at the 2022 European Athletics Championships in Munich, Germany, between 15 and 21 August 2022

Medallists

Results

Czech Republic entered the following athletes. 

 Men 
 Track and road

Field events

Combined events – Decathlon

Women
 Track and road

Field events

Combined events – Heptathlon

References

External links
European Athletics Championships

2022
Nations at the 2022 European Athletics Championships
European Championships in Athletics